The Neuhaus Palace (often written in its Hungarianized form Neuhausz) is a historic building in the Victory Square of Timișoara, Romania.

History 
The palace lies in a continuous front of monumental Secession buildings, between the Lloyd Palace and the Merbl Palace. In 1917, Ernő Neuhausz sold the building to the then well-known Färber family, who kept the building until the 1950s, when it was nationalized and the family had to emigrate due to the communist regime. Members of the Färber family are still the owners of some spaces in the building, which they managed to get back after 1990.

Architecture 
Neuhaus Palace is a symmetrical building. The plasticity of the facade is specific to the second manifestation of the Secession movement in the architecture of Timișoara, with geometric and simplified decorations. Noteworthy is the oversized pediment, awning of the two oversized bay windows covered with a copper roof and joined by a series of loggias. On the ground floor of the four-story building are commercial spaces.

References 

Buildings and structures in Timișoara
Buildings and structures completed in 1912